Adults Only or variants refers to

Entertainment content rating
Many age based content ratings denote content deemed suitable only for adults, and are often identified or defined as "Adults Only":
Adults Only (AO); assigned to video games by the Entertainment Software Rating Board (ESRB)
List of AO-rated video games; a list of games given the "Adults Only 18+" rating by the ESRB
NC-17 – Adults Only; assigned to films by the Motion Picture Association of America film rating system (MPAA)
List of NC-17 rated films; a list of films rated NC-17 by the MPAA
18 rating (many variants), a common "adults only" rating used by classification organizations
R18 (disambiguation) (many variants), an "adults only" rating used by several classification organizations
X rating,  a common "adults only" rating used by classification organizations

Visual and audio media

Films
Adults Only (film), premiering at the 63rd Venice International Film Festival

Albums
Adults Only,  album by Peter Rauhofer and Club 69 1994
Adults Only, album by Mungo Jerry
Adults Only: The Final Album, Aaron Hall (singer) 2005
Adults Only, Mike Botts  (2000) 
Adults Only, Ringo Sheena
For Adults Only, Bill Cosby album

Songs
"Adults Only", a song by Slick Rick on the album The Art of Storytelling
"For Adults Only", The Compositions Of Al Cohn 1953
"Adults Only", song by Manfred Mann from Soft Vengeance